Hydrophis czeblukovi, also known commonly as the fine-spined sea snake, the geometrical sea snake, and the geometrical seasnake, is species of venomous snake in the subfamily Hydrophiinae of the family Elapidae. The species is native to waters off northern Australia.

Etymology
The specific name, czeblukovi, is in honor of Russian herpetologist Vladimir P. Czeblukov.

Habitat 

Diet
H. czeblukovi preys upon marine fishes.

Reproduction
H. czeblukovi is viviparous.

References

Further reading
Cogger HG (2014). Reptiles and Amphibians of Australia, Seventh Edition. Clayton, Victoria, Australia: CSIRO Publishing. xxx + 1,033 pp. .
Kharin VE (1984). "[A review of sea snakes of the group Hydrophis sensu lato (Serpentes, Hydrophiidae). 3. The genus Leioselasma]". Zoologicheskii Zhurnal 63 (10): 1535–1546. (Lieoselasma czeblukovi, new species, p. 1542). (in Russian).
Kharin VE (2005). "[On new findings of a rare sea snake Leioselamsa czeblukovi Kharin, 1984, with remarks on species composition and taxonomical position of the genus Leioselasma Lacepede, 1804, (Serpentes: Hydrophiidae)]". Russian Journal of Marine Biology 31: 269–272.
Kharin VE, Hallermann J (2010). "A remote new distribution record and a redescription of a rare and little-known sea snake, Leioselasma czeblukovi Kharin, 1984 (Hydrophiidae)". Herpetology Notes 3: 315–319.
Rasmussen AR, Smith LA (1997). "The taxonomic status of the sea snake Hydrophis czeblukovi (Kharin 1984) from north-west Australian waters". Amphibia-Reptilia 18: 419–425.
Smith LA (1986). "A new species of Hydrophis (Serpentes: Hydrophiidae) from north-west Australian waters". Records of the Western Australian Museum 13 (1): 151–153. (Hydrophis geometricus, new species).
Wilson S, Swan G (2013). A Complete Guide to Reptiles of Australia, Fourth Edition. Sydney: New Holland Publishers. 522 pp. .

Reptiles described in 1984
Hydrophis
Snakes of Australia